Thorncroftia is a genus of flowering plants in the mint family, Lamiaceae, first described as a genus in 1912. It is native to southern Africa.

Species
 Thorncroftia greenii Changwe & K.Balkwill - KwaZulu-Natal
 Thorncroftia longiflora N.E.Br - Mpumalanga, Eswatini
 Thorncroftia lotteri T.J.Edwards & McMurtry - Mpumalanga
 Thorncroftia media Codd - Northern Province of South Africa
 Thorncroftia succulenta (R.A.Dyer & E.A.Bruce) Codd - Northern Province of South Africa
 Thorncroftia thorncroftii (S.Moore) Codd - Mpumalanga, Eswatini, Northern Province of South Africa

References

External links

Lamiaceae
Lamiaceae genera
Flora of Southern Africa
Taxa named by N. E. Brown